Francisco Briceño, natural de Corral de almagüer. (died 30 Jul 1571) was a Roman Catholic prelate who served as the sixth Bishop of Almería (1571).

Biography
On 5 March 1571, he was selected by the King of Spain and confirmed by Pope Pius V as Bishop of Almería. He served as Bishop of Almería until his death on 30 July 1571.

See also 
Catholic Church in Spain

References 

1571 deaths
16th-century Roman Catholic bishops in Spain
Bishops appointed by Pope Pius V